Dhulikhel Medical Institute (DMI ), in Dhulikhel, Nepal, was created in 1998 through a partnership between Dhulikhel Hospital, Kathmandu University, and Til Ganga Eye Care Centre with the assistance of DANIDA, Dhulikhel Municipality Quality Education Project. It is an autonomous, independent training institution established to train different faculties of health manpower.

The first graduation ceremony of DMI was in 2002 January. There were eleven students: four in Nursing, six in General Medicine and one in Clinical Health Laboratory.  There are currently about 300 students in nursing, general medicine, clinical health laboratory, ophthalmology and physiotherapy. A Diploma in Health Sciences is granted by Kathmandu University School of Medical Sciences after the successful completion of the three-year academic course. The graduated students from DMI are providing services in different parts of Nepal as well as many other foreign countries.

Faculties

Dhulikhel Medical Institute is providing quality education and training in different faculties.

 Nursing
 General Medicine
 Clinical Health Laboratory
 Ophthalmology
 Physiotherapy

References

Educational institutions established in 1998
Medical colleges in Nepal
1998 establishments in Nepal
Organisations associated with Kathmandu University